blackra1n is a program that jailbreaks versions 3.1, 3.1.1 and 3.1.2 of Apple's operating system for the iPhone and the iPod Touch, known as iOS.

The program uses a bug in the USB code of the firmware for the iPhone and the iPod Touch, allowing unsigned code to be executed. blackra1n uses this exploit to patch the firmware of the iPhone or iPod Touch while in DFU (Device Firmware Upgrade) mode. This mode is used when upgrading firmware through iTunes, but also can be activated by the user. The program allows users to install the Cydia, Icy (removed in blackra1n RC3), and Rock package managers. These applications allow the user to access tweaks, homebrew applications, the root directory and the file system of the iOS device. blackra1n can also perform tethered jailbreaks on the iPod Touch 3G and the iPhone 3GS, if the devices are running OS 3.1.2. When iOS 3.1.3 was released, SpiritJB was released, and provided untethered jailbreaks for both 3.1.2 and 3.1.3.

blackra1n has been superseded by Spirit by comex.

Releases

References

External links
 
 Limera1n

See also
 purplera1n (no longer supported or hosted) 

Homebrew software
IOS software
IOS jailbreaks